The Coastal Plain League (CPL) is a wood-bat collegiate summer baseball league, featuring college players recruited from throughout the nation. The league takes its name from the Class D level Coastal League which operated in the area from 1937 to 1952.

History
The modern Coastal Plain League was formed with six teams in 1997. The league has expanded over the years with teams across North Carolina, South Carolina, Virginia, and Georgia, with the 2023 addition of the Boone Bigfoots being the most recent expansion, bringing the league to 14 teams.

Founding
The league was founded in 1997 by Pete Bock. Bock conceived the idea in the early 1990s while traveling long distances to the Valley Baseball League in Virginia to see his son, Jeff, play summer baseball. Bock, an experienced sports executive, wanted a collegiate summer league closer to his home. He acted on it and the Coastal Plain league began play for the 1997 season.

Past champions

Petitt Cup years

Playoff seedings based on overall record, so division champions listed are based on overall record.

Pre-Petitt Cup

Teams

Former teams
Raleigh RedWolves (1997, moved to Florence)
Rocky Mount Rockfish (1997–98)
Durham Braves (1997–2000, renamed Durham Americans)
Durham Americans (2001–03, formerly Durham Braves)
Spartanburg Stingers (2003–07, moved to Forest City, renamed Owls)
New Bern River Rats (2005–07, moved to Morehead City, renamed Marlins in 2010)
Outer Banks Daredevils (1997, 1999-2011, changed leagues)
Petersburg Generals (2000–2016)
Edenton Steamers (1998–2019, changed leagues)
Fayetteville SwampDogs (2001–2019)
Gastonia Grizzlies (2002–2020, moved to Spartanburg, renamed Spartanburgers)
Spartanburgers (2021, suspended operations)
Savannah Bananas (2016–2022, left league to concentrate on its professional exhibition operation)

References

External links
 Official site

 
Summer baseball leagues
College baseball leagues in the United States
Baseball leagues in North Carolina
Baseball leagues in South Carolina
Baseball leagues in Virginia
Sports leagues established in 1997
1997 establishments in the United States